James Alfred Taylor (September 25, 1878 – June 9, 1956) was an American politician, a member of the Democratic Party from West Virginia.

Taylor was born near Ironton (Lawrence County, Ohio), where he attended the public schools. After graduating, he worked in a printing office in Ironton, before he moved to Alderson, West Virginia, where he also was engaged in the newspaper business.

In 1905 he moved from Greenbrier County to Fayette County. Taylor served as a noncommissioned officer in the West Virginia National Guard from 1908 to 1911.

His political career began in 1916, when he was elected and took seat in West Virginia House of Delegates. Taylor served in this body until 1918 and later again two times (1920–22 and 1930–32). He eventually rose to Speaker during his last term.

in 1922 he was elected to the U.S. House of Representatives from West Virginia's 6th District (now defunct). He served two terms (re-elected in 1924) from March 4, 1923 to March 3, 1927. He was defeated in his bid for a third term by Republican candidate Edward T. England.

Taylor resumed the newspaper publishing business and unsuccessfully sought the Democratic nomination for Governor in 1928. During his later career he served on the West Virginia Liquor Commission (1941–45) and was elected a member of the Fayette County Board of Education in 1946 for a six-year term.

Taylor died in Montgomery, West Virginia and was interred in Huse Memorial Park in Fayetteville.

External links
 Congressional biography

1878 births
1956 deaths
American newspaper publishers (people)
American Presbyterians
Democratic Party members of the West Virginia House of Delegates
People from Alderson, West Virginia
People from Fayette County, West Virginia
People from Lawrence County, Ohio
School board members in West Virginia
Speakers of the West Virginia House of Delegates
West Virginia National Guard personnel
Military personnel from West Virginia
Democratic Party members of the United States House of Representatives from West Virginia
Journalists from Ohio